Lee Hyun-ji (born January 19, 1987) is a former singer from South Korea. She began her career as a member of the electronica group Banana Girl before debuting as a solo artist in 2008 with the album, Kiss Me Kiss Me. She has since retired from the entertainment industry and works as a kindergarten teacher.

Discography

Album

Filmography

References

1987 births
Living people
South Korean women pop singers
South Korean television personalities
21st-century South Korean singers
21st-century South Korean women singers